The Alta Vista Botanical Gardens is a botanical garden located in Vista, California, in the United States. The mission of the gardens is to "bring together people, nature and art". The purpose of the garden is to provide an interactive living classroom for North San Diego County students.

History 
"Plans for a botanical garden in Vista go back more than 35 years, and a nonprofit formed in 1999 to oversee the project". In November 2005, the gardens' board of directors adopted a new master plan created by Todd Cure', Bryan Morse and Ron Holloway, for a collection of themed garden spaces and gathering spots that were to be built on 13 acres (5.2 ha) of city-owned land at the top of a hill in Brengle Terrace Park. Shortly after, the Vista City Council unanimously approved the plan. Council members called the plan "inspiring" and "magical" and acknowledged that the gardens have been a long-awaited goal of the city. "A lot of dreams went into this", Councilwoman Judy Ritter said after the vote. In April 2009, a final plan for Alta Vista Garden's new Bugs, Birds & Butterflies Children's Garden was submitted to the board for approval.

The garden owes its design and growth to many talented individuals.
 Civil engineer Ron Holloway, a founding board member and current board president, has promoted and nurtured nearly all aspects of the gardens.
 Landscape architect Todd Cure' and environmental artist Bryan Morse joined the revamped board in 2003.
 Todd Curé and Bryan Morse jointly created the 2005 Master Plan, the 2009 and 2016 Children's Garden Plan, Reception Garden, Obelisk Monument, Welcome Garden, Tailspin Kite Plaza, Lowes Discovery Plaza, Jungle Pavilion, and Upper Jungle Waterfall/Pond.
Todd Cure' was board president for two years (July 2008 - July 2010).  While Todd was president his vision helped guide the start of the Art in the Garden outdoor sculpture program, the annual Vista Earth Day Festival, and the annual Vista Fall Festival.
 Bryan Morse tirelessly donated thousands of hours, four original sculptures and materials to the garden while president of the board for six years (July 2010 - July 2016). His vision and creativity were instrumental in branding the gardens and evolving the New Master Plan (with landscape architect Kristina Marder) which was adopted in the fall of 2013.  Bryan is an environmental artist and contractor who worked barefoot while building and maintaining the majority of the gardens. A San Diego Union-Tribune news article in 2012 states, "Bryan Morse, the president and CEO of the group, walks through the Gardens with bare feet. He can name most of the plants spread throughout the various themed areas because he planted most of them. 'Everything's a work in progress', he said."

Butterfly habitat 

The gardens are certified by the North American Butterfly Association as a butterfly habitat and as a wildlife habitat by the National Wildlife Federation. As part of this certification, the gardens have taken a pledge to be chemical and pesticide free. "The Garden utilizes only natural solutions toward the maintenance and health of the Gardens. Everything at Alta Vista Gardens is done naturally," Bryan Morse said. "Here, we're totally organic," he said. "We're a nature habitat. We don't use any chemicals at all. We don't use any bug spray. We don't use fertilizers unless they're 100 percent organic. Everything is done that way. That's why we have more hummingbirds and more butterflies and more ladybugs and everything else. The nature is coming to the place." Of special interest to visitors is the incredible array of butterflies that fill the air all over the gardens. Early on, a conscious effort was made to plant the primary food sources of many different butterfly species. The result is that large colonies are making their home at Alta Vista Gardens. Over the years the gardens have planted thousands of milkweed plants, the host plant for the monarch butterfly. The dominant variety is Asclepias curassavica however, Asclepias eriocarpa may be found in the California Native and the Desert Gardens. A large part of the Jungle Garden is dedicated to the creation of a sub-tropical food forest which creates habitat for butterflies and birds. Although the Children's Garden is the central home of the monarch butterfly colony, butterflies can now be found in all corners of the gardens.

Gardens 
 Australasia Garden; Designed and installed by Bryan Morse
 Birds, Bugs and Butterflies Children's Garden
 Jeffrey Stein Children's Music Garden; Designed and Installed by Naomi Stein
 Dino Digs; Designed and installed by Bryan Morse
 Kite Plaza; Designed and installed by Bryan Morse and Todd Cure'
 Totally Tubular; Designed and installed by Bryan Morse
 Butterfly Teepee; Designed and installed by Bryan Morse
 Incredible Edibles; Designed and installed by Bryan Morse and Todd Cure'
 Lowe's Plaza; Designed and installed by Bryan Morse and Todd Cure'
 Jungle Garden
 Ponds and waterway; Designed by Bryan Morse and Todd Cure', built by Bryan Morse
 Unusual Fruit Garden; Designed and installed by Bryan Morse
 Jungle Shade Garden; Designed and installed by Bryan Morse
 Sub Tropical Garden, Designed and installed by Bryan Morse
 Mediterranean Garden; Designed and installed by Bryan Morse
 Labyrinth; Designed and installed by Bryan Morse
 Sharon Kern Culinary Herb Garden; Designed by Naomi Stein and Bryan Morse, built by Bryan Morse
 Poet's Patio; Designed and installed by Bryan Morse
 Ceremonial Garden; Designed and installed by Bryan Morse
 Medicinal Herb Garden; Designed and Installed by Naomi Stein
 Prehistoric and Cycad Garden; Designed by Bryan Morse and John Voss, built by Bryan Morse
 California Native Garden; Designed and installed by Bryan Morse
 Arid Garden;  Designed and installed by Bryan Morse
 Oasis in the Desert;  Designed and installed by Bryan Morse
 Medicine Wheel: from Native American tradition; Designed and installed by Bryan Morse
 Dry Stream Bed
 Aloe & Agave Collection; Designed and installed by Bryan Morse
 Opuntia Collection; Designed and installed by Bryan Morse
 South African Garden; Designed and installed by Bryan Morse
 Madagascar Garden; Designed and installed by Bryan Morse
 Pan-Asian Garden; Designed and installed by Bryan Morse
 Heritage Rose Collection; Designed by Ivy Bodin and Bryan Morse, installed by Bryan Morse

Art in the Garden 
Alta Vista Garden's mission is to "bring together people, nature and art".
Patrice Dunn donated the first sculpture to Alta Vista Gardens and others followed. Below is a list of artists in the order that they joined the garden.
 Melissa Ralston: Tail Spin (2009), Blessing Tree (2010)
 Charles Bronson: Sea Breeze (2009), Born to Run (2010)
 Steve Bundy: Calla Lily (2009)
 Anthony Amato: Broken Link (2009)
 Lia Strell: A Creative Bloom (2009), Golden Torsion (2011), Sacred Ginko (2015)
 Buddy Smith: mosaic table top (2009)
 Mindy Rodman and Paul White: Miro Kite (2010)
 Benjamin Lavender: Kite of Paradise (2010)
 Fritzie Urquhart: The Constellation Tree (2010)
 Bryan Morse: Chanson Joyeuse patio (Joyous Song) (2010), I Raggi Crescenti di Amore patio (Expanding Rays of Love) (2010), Three Easter Island Statues (2012), "Mushrooms" (2012), "Tree of Life Bench" (2014) The Mouth of Truth (2015) 
 Robert Rochin: Piano Pebble Chime (2010), Baobab Tree (2014)
 John Dole: Arborescence (2011)
 Morris Squire: Lamed (2011)
 Phillip Galshoff: Five whimsical sculptures grace the Sharon Kern Culinary Herb Garden Chef "D", Shari Chef, Penelope Hoop, Silly Boy Trey and Flying Chef (2012)
 Dan Peragine: Transpersonal (2013), located just below the Cycad Garden
 Anne Little: Human Sundial (2014) and over forty mosaic signs created with a grant from the Kenneth A. Picerne Foundation
 Quilted Glories of the Garden - Linda Bannan: "Horse Sculpture", Melanie Chang: "Banana Leaves", Carol Clarke: "Water Lily", Lendia Kinnaman: "Dragon Fly", Carole Lee: "Kite Tail Sculpture", Cheri McClow: "Front of the Garden House", Sue Ramos: "Succulent" (2015)
 Ricardo Breceda: Tyrannosaurus, Tricerotops, Velociraptor, Scorpion, Two Giraffes, Agave, Spinosaurus, Serpent (2015)

Gallery

See also
 List of botanical gardens in California

References

External links

Map for Garden

Botanical gardens in California
Parks in San Diego County, California
Vista, California